Solorina is a genus of 10 species of lichenized fungi in the family Peltigeraceae. The genus was first described by the Swedish botanist Erik Acharius in 1808. Members of the genus are commonly called socket lichens.

Species

Solorina bispora 
Solorina crocea 
Solorina crocoides 
Solorina embolina 
Solorina fuegiensis 
Solorina octospora 
Solorina platycarpa 
Solorina saccata 
Solorina simensis 
Solorina spongiosa

References

Peltigerales
Lichen genera
Taxa named by Erik Acharius
Peltigerales genera
Taxa described in 1808